This is a list of equipment in use by the Croatian Army.

Small arms

Handguns

Submachine guns

Assault rifles

HS Produkt VHS2 is domestically produced assault rifle that became a mainstay of Croatian Army, having replaced Zastava M70 in its entirety. Currently some 25000 VHS-2 Rifles are in service with the armed forces, and 7800 older VHS rifles have been relegated in to reserve and training units. Army has also noumber of various NATO manufactured assault rifles including FN F2000, Heckler & Koch G36, Heckler & Koch HK416, Colt M4 to name few.

Sniper rifles

Grenade launchers

Machine guns

Croatian Army inherited a vast quantity of Yugoslav era weapons, including massive quantity of small arms. among these, some 1400 M84 Yugoslav made 7.62 Machine gun and 6000 M77 light machine gun which are still in use to this day. Replacement by modern western counterparts in part was resisted by the army due to the cost but also due to the fact Croatia had huge amount of 7.62mm calibre ammunition for M84 Machine gun, in fact replacing M84 would have been unnecessary cost when country's Army undergoing modernization and vital funds are needed elsewhere. However the army has purchased large noumber of western machine guns, including Ultimax 100, FN MAG and other. Army recently held international competition for light machine gun replacement and FN M249 was chosen as best option with Army looking to order between 500 and 1000 M249 and is talking to local manufacture HS Product in establishing long term production under licence from Belgian producer for Croatian but also export needs. Army has purchased undisclosed number of  Heckler & Koch MG5 and MG4s, believed to be around 40-50 samples, with future requirement for at least 500 of these weapons.

Vehicles

Tanks

Currently the Croatian Army operates 75 M84A4 tanks, the tanks are deployed in to 5 armoured companies with each company having 14 tanks in total two armoured battalions. Further two tanks are used for training. Croatian Army was looking at modernizing M84A4 tanks to the A5 standard at one point, which would see installation of improved fire control, new battlefield management system, 3rd generation thermal sight, advanced ERA armour package consisting of reactive and passive armour tiles covering 180 degrees of the front face of the tank and much of the roof of the tank, increasing armoured protection of the tank from current 590mm to some 750mm of frontal protection. Modernization also included an improved engine unit and rubber inserts for tank tracks alongside new communications and GPS navigation equipment. However the cost of upgrade exceeded the modernization budget so only a limited general overhaul was agreed which includes only rubber track insets for tank tracks and complete overhaul of M84 tank at allocated cost of around $450,000 per tank. The upgrade of the tanks to the M84A5 standard would have costed around 23 million kuna per tank or just over 1.65 billion kuna for the entire fleet or roughly $252 million.

In recent statement Defence Minister announced plans for modernization of armed forces including replacing M84 Tanks with western made tank in near future. Croatian Army plans to replace M84A4 tanks with a Western made tank, either the Leopard 2A7+, Korean K2 Black Panther tank or the French Leclerc Tank, and have already started to talk to French and German counterparts in acquiring Leopard 2A7+ or latest Leclerc MBT. It is estimated if Croatian Army replaces M84A4 tanks on a one for one basis, the new tanks would cost the Army some €720 million. The Army stated requirement are for roughly 100 tanks or two armoured battalions + several driver training tanks.

Tracked vehicles

The Croatian Army relies heavily on Yugoslav era armoured vehicles in its inventory precisely the M80A which was developed in late 1970s to meet Yugoslav Army requirements. The Croatian Army inherited some 134 vehicles from Yugoslav Army through capture of said vehicles in early 1990s, some 128 were put into service with the Croatian Army. Currently the vehicles are deployed in 2 mechanized infantry battalions with one additional M80A company attached to the 2nd Armoured Battalion of Armoured Mechanized Brigade in Vinkovci. For the past 10 years the Croatian Army was trying to secure funding for the replacement of M80A which are seen as inadequate by modern NATO standards offering poor protection, poor overall performance and high maintenance cost. The Croatian Army has secured a partial replacement of the M80A with M2A2 ODS Bradley Infantry Fighting Vehicles which are being delivered to Croatian Army. There is a probability based on current requirements that the Croatian Army will order additional vehicles so it can completely retire the obsolete M80A vehicles from service by 2030. It is estimated that the Croatian Army needs 180 vehicles in total to fulfil that requirement. Croatia intends to upgrade M2A2 ODS Bradley Infantry Fighting Vehicles to similar standard to US M4 variants, BAE Systems will be engaged with the local manufacturer Duro Djakovic to modernize all vehicles to latest standard, it is not clear if upgraded vehicles will retain 25mm bushmaster cannon or 30mm cannon and entirely new turret will be designed for the vehicle. It is also not clear if Croatia will order additional Bradley vehicles, or these vehicles are interim solution before latest IFV such as CV 90Mk4 or Puma IFV are purchased sometimes later in the decade. Bradley vehicles were purchased rather fast to fulfil Croatia's NATO obligation but also to replace some of the M80A infantry fighting vehicles which are seen as inadequate.

Wheeled armoured personnel vehicles

The Croatian Army's main wheeled APC is the Patria AMV, 127 vehicles are currently in service with at least 35 more to join the service in the upcoming year or two. Some 108 vehicles are armed with Protector (RWS) Remote Weapon Station and 9 vehicles are armed with Elbit's UT30MK2 turrets. Through US donations the army has received a large number of mine resistant vehicles, including some 172 Oshkosh M-ATV armed with 12.7mm HMG, it is not clear if the army plans to modernize the Oshkosh M-ATV with the remote weapon station, but this is probably one of the longer term priorities.

Combat engineering vehicles
The Army maintains an impressive arsenal of non-combat engineering vehicles from diggers, loaders and various heavy duty trucks. In this segment the Croatian Army is fully equipped and Army engineering units are fully engaged in various domestic and international missions from participating in various UN missions, NATO missions and domestic emergency missions such as floods, construction of roads or land clearance for participating in fighting fires. In 2017 the Army acquired 2 Kalmar RT 240 Container handlers, with further two added to army's logistics in 2020 as well as number of new CASE and JCB diggers, loaders and so on.

Anti-aircraft warfare
The Croatian Army is heavily reliant on short range air defence systems such as the Strijela - 10CROA1, which although modernized offers only limited surface to air cover inadequate to deal with modern threats of UAV attack drones and other threats. The Army short term plan includes purchase of short and medium range surface to air missile batteries. Initially plan was to look at NASAMSIII/ER, Mica VL/NG and SPYDER as likely contenders however Mica VL/NG was chosen, most likely due to the Croatian Air Force purchase of Dassault Rafale fighter aircraft. The Croatian Army plans to acquire up to 4 surface to air batteries batteries in a deal worth around €500 million.  The short range system also being french in this case Mistral, with Mica VL providing medium range air defence. Both systems will enter service in 2024 and 2026. Croatia has opted for purchase of the new Mica VL/NG missiles, with an extended range to over 50 km, when they become available, Croatia has a requirements for at least 4 medium range surface to air batteries or 24 launchers with up to 144 missiles. Long range air defence is yet to be decided on, however with recent purchase of Mistral ER and very likely Mica VL NG, it wouldn't be unusual if Croatia opted for Aster SAMP/T NG long range air defence systems when it becomes available, however any purchase of such air defence system would happen in late 2020s.

 Although Croatia had acquired the S-300PMU-1 long-range surface-to-air missile system from Ukraine in 1994, and demonstrated some of the systems parts on the 1995 military parade held in Zagreb, it is believed that the system was never fully completed and operational although the training of crews was held as late as 1998. Some sources claim that the weapon was subsequently handed-over to the United States or Israel in 2002–2004. However, officials still claim that the system is still stored somewhere in Croatia and the exact fate of the system is to this day classified.

Anti-tank weapons

Currently the Croatian Army has a mix of anti tank systems in use, with vast majority of current inventory dating back to 1990s when during the Croatian War of Independence, the Croatian National Guard managed to capture massive stores of Yugoslav Army weapon stockpiles including large quantity of anti tank missiles of Soviet and Yugoslav origin. The Croatian Army also purchased a number of Russian anti tank systems during the War, systems which were never used by the Yugoslav Army. Many of these systems are now obsolete by modern standards and are not compatible with NATO equipment requirements. Due to the shortage of funds, the purchase of modern NATO compatible anti tank systems wasn't on the agenda until the recent purchase of Bradley M2A2 ODS IFVs and Patria AMV IFVs. The Croatian Army has secured 20 Spike launchers with at least 200 Spike LR 2 missiles that will be mounted on 9 Patria AMV IFVs, with 2 launchers per vehicle, with further two launchers for training. With the purchase of M2A2 ODS Bradley IFVs, the Croatian Army went on ahead and ordered a large quantity of TOW 2 missiles in several configurations, both missile systems once they enter service will be vehicle mounted. Finally Croatian Army plans to introduce new anti tank missiles, USA made FGM-148 Javelin have been chosen as main infantry support weapon along with German made RGW 90 Matador RPG, initially 100 Javelin Launchers will be purchased with several hundred missiles and at least 300 Metador RPG systems. However as there are 7 mechanized infantry combat battalions currently in the Army, there's a requirement for a large number of infantry portable ATGM launchers, with requirements for at least 224 launchers.32 Hellfire missile launchers with a larger number of Hellfire Romeo missiles were purchased, mainly for use on Croatian Air Force OH-58D(R) helicopters. Future purchases of additional launchers and missiles are very likely, especially if Croatia acquires combat/attack drones and attack helicopters.

Artillery

Mortars

The Croatian Army has a vast stockpile of mortars. It is estimated that nearly 2000 mortars of various kind and over quarter a million rounds are in possession. The vast stock of mortars and mortar rounds was captured from the Yugoslav Army when the Croatian National Guard managed to capture massive Yugoslav Army barracks in Zagreb, Varaždin, Bjelovar and other towns across Croatia during the Battle of the Barracks. Currently only a fraction of this arsenal is in use, with the rest stored and in reserve. All systems are NATO compatible so currently the Army has no known plans to replace these systems.

Towed artillery

The Croatian Army captured a vast stock of Yugoslav Army artillery and ordnance, much of it now remains stored or is awaiting disposal. Due to NATO interoperability the Croatian Army has no use of outdated Yugoslav era systems however due to the lack of funds the Army is forced to retain some of the systems such as D-30 howitzers in active service. Ideally the M777 howitzer or CAESAR self-propelled howitzer would be the most likely choice for field artillery formations but due to lack of funding this remains a distant priority.

Self-propelled howitzers

The Croatian Army captured 11 2S1 Gvozdika self propelled howitzers during the Croatian War of Independence and the Battle of Barracks but 2 systems were damaged and scrapped with one being displayed in the Army museum in Vukovar. Effectively the Croatian Army had only one battery of self propelled artillery which caused considerable issues with training and combat capabilities offered by the somewhat dated artillery system. The decision was made to purchase modern self propelled artillery system with Swedish Bofors Archer, American M109A6 Paladin and German PzH 2000 being favoured. In the end the Croatian Army purchased 16 PzH 2000 howitzers from the German Army stock and entered service with the Army in 2019. There is a plan to purchase additional PzH 2000 systems, Croatian Army plans to purchase at least 8 additional systems and up to 12 systems with in next few years. Croatian Army is also looking at wheeled artillery system to equip medium mechanized brigade and potential candidates are French Cesar SPH artillery system which has proven combat effectiveness.

Rocket artillery

Due to lack of funding Croatian Army had to rely heavily on ex-Yugoslav/Soviet rocket systems, consequently in an effort to modernize this branch, Army tried to acquire United States made MLRS System in 2015, when then Croatian Government in principle agreed delivery of 16 M270 with the US Government, but due to some reasons, Croatian Government didn't proceed to finalize purchase of the system. Currently army uses Soviet and Yugoslav origin Multiple launch rocket systems that date back to 60s in their design; as these systems are totally incompatible with current NATO doctrine, army is trying to look for alternatives. M270 is still an option, pending US Congress approval, however HIMARS is another option Croatian army is currently considering. Swapping current inventory of ex-Yu/Soviet rocket systems for HIMARS is one option,. If the deal with the United States can be agreed on, Croatia could get up to 8 systems for free in exchange for 32 of its own Ex-Soviet/Yu systems. Croatian Army however, has requirement for at least 24 HIMARS systems, cost of which is around $120 million + $170 000 per rocket.

Unmanned aerial vehicles

Currently Croatian Army has assortment of domestic and mostly Israeli UAVs purchased in past few decades, with Skylark of which Army had deployed to battalion level is most common UAV, brigade level UAVs currently are domestically produced  M99_Bojnik of which several are still operational in support, but replaced by modern Israeli built Aeronautics Orbiter 3b, of which Croatia initially purchased only 6, but with new order for at least 6 more due to ongoing Russo-Ukrainian War. Armed forces plan to purchase additional combat drones as well as additional reconnaissance drones in coming months from local manufacturers.   Currently Army operates noumber of DJI Inspire and DJI MAvic 2, deployed along battalion and Company level , units, with estimated 20-30 or so tiny drones that aren't really designed for military operations. Croatian Armed Forces Drone command was established  at Pula airport and airbase  which up to 2020 was used primarily for Tourist arrivals. Croatian Army started to test locally developed loitering munition of yet unknown Croatian producer, but Croatia has many decades of experience in manufacturing unmanned drones and locally there are at least half a dozen manufacturers with the technology and know-how.

Army Radars, Communications and Reconnaissance Equipment

Croatian Army inherited large stock of Yugoslav communication and reconnaissance equipment mostly through capture during the war of Croatian independence in early 1990s. Modernization of communication, data network and reconnaissance vehicles and equipment started only after 2010 with purchase of large noumber of communication and secure data sets from United States, the UK and France. Donations of data network by US in particular helped Croatian Army's to equip most of its combat and support units with latest NATO standard equipment but also enabled Army to integrate link 16 data sharing network with most of its assets, however this does not include older equipment that is scheduled for retirement in next few years. Army' hopes to integrate all its assets and be able to share data when needed on the battlefield with all NATO partners therefore be fully integrate into NATO's defence structure.

Army currently uses mix of US, UK and French communication equipment provided by 3 major defence suppliers, Thales, Kongsberg Defence & Aerospace and Harris L3Harris Technologies.

Army Medical Equipment 

Croatian Army is currently equipped with an army field hospital but hospital isn't suitable for major emergency operations and lacks ability to operate in combat theatre supporting army when required. However Army has purchased large field hospital from US for $6.07 million in 2021. Role 2B military field hospital is designed to provide emergency care in combat theatre of operations. Army has requirement for at least 2 
Role 2B field hospitals which are designed to provide support for standard NATO Brigade size formations or between 4000 to 7000 personnel   in a theatre of combat operations. Currently Army plans to equip one field Role 2B hospital and expand it as per requirements. Army has already purchased number of medical vehicles and is negotiating noumber of helicopters to compliment this branch of Croatian Army.

Army Logistics, Military trucks and Multi-use vehicles
The Croatian Army inherited a vast stock of trucks, four wheel drive, various transport and utility vehicles during the Croatian War of Independence and the Battle of the Barracks, at least 250 FAP trucks, 650 TAM trucks and a number of Soviet trucks such as ZiL, Ural or Maz were captured and put into military service. Many of these vehicles are still in service with the Croatian Army, even though some are over 40 years old. Torpedo 4x4 trucks, light 2.5T trucks were built in large quantities. Some 80 samples entered service with the Army in early 1990s. However, with Croatia joining NATO the Croatian Army started looking into acquiring western types of trucks including MAN TG Mill, Iveco 5T Transport Truck, Mercedes trucks among others. However due to the shortage of funds, delivery of new logistic and tactical trucks is somewhat lacking. In the past decade the Croatian Army started to renew its logistic and tactical truck fleet sporadically with purchases or donations of smaller quantities of new trucks. The Croatian Army stated the requirement of 1250 tactical/logistic trucks as the current desired goal.

Logistic Vehicles and Military trucks

Military 4WD utility vehicles

Civilian multi-use trucks and utility vehicles 

The Croatian Army relies heavily on the stock of old trucks and supply vehicles. Some were bought brand new but the majority were captured from the Yugoslav Army barracks during the Croatian War of Independence. Slowly, this old equipment is being replaced, however due to the shortage of funds logistics formations within the Croatian Army are the last to get modern vehicles. In the long-term the Croatian Army plans to the reduce number of vehicle types in service down to only 3 manufactures: MAN, Mercedes and Iveco. Currently over a dozen of different manufactures of vehicle types are in service creating costly maintenance issues.

Equipment withdrawn from service or in storage
FN FAL - 7.62×51mm, 5,000 stored to be sold off, some still in use by the Ministry of Interior.
Zastava M84 - 7.62×54mmR, totally phased out and replaced by western systems.
Zastava M76 - 7.92×57mm sniper rifle, phased out entirely. Replaced by Remington and Sako in service within the Croatian Army.
M80 "Zolja" RPG - phased out due to dwindling stock, replaced by AT4
RPG-7 - system retired but some might be used by army reserve and for training purposes only.
RPG-22 - system replaced by AT4 and other RPGs currently in use with the Army.
BRDM-2 - in the local army museum
BTR-60 - 2 in the local army museum.
M60P/M60SAN - Yugoslav-made APCs, two are in the local army museum.
MT-LB - 2 in local museum, the rest were scrapped and replaced by Patria AMV.
M-47 Patton - 2 in the local army museum and rest are used for target practice.
T-55A - Withdrawal of over 280 units started in 2006 with a dozen or so tanks used for training until late 2009, that is no longer the case due to the shortage of funds and all units have now been withdrawn and are awaiting disposal.
M-63 Plamen - 128mm towed MRL, retired due to lack of ammunition and costly upkeep, no spare parts for the system.
M-94 'Plamen S - 128mm MRL, no longer fit for purpose, retired and awaiting disposal.
M-87 Orkan - 260mm MRL, captured during Battle of the Barracks in 1991. Systems are kept in reserve status due to lack of proper ammunition.
ZSU-57-2 - used as target practice.
M53/59 Praga - 2 in the local army museum.

References

Army
Croatia
Equipment